Valentino Antwon Blake (born August 9, 1990) is a former American football cornerback and special teamer. He was signed by the Jacksonville Jaguars as an undrafted free agent in 2012 and also played for the Pittsburgh Steelers, Tennessee Titans, and New York Giants. He played college football at Texas–El Paso (UTEP).

In September 2016, Blake changed his first name from Antwon to Valentino.

College career
He played college football at Texas-El Paso (UTEP) from 2008 to 2011. During his career at UTEP, Blake totaled 137 tackles, 1 sack, 2 forced fumbles, and 1 interception.
He started every game his junior and senior years also started 1 game his sophomore season before suffering an ankle injury.

Professional career

Jacksonville Jaguars
Blake signed with the Jacksonville Jaguars following the 2012 NFL Draft as a rookie free agent.

He was released on September 1, 2013.

Pittsburgh Steelers
On September 2, 2013, Blake was claimed on waivers by the Steelers. Blake would remain on the team over the next 3 seasons. He gathered his first interception during a Week 8, 2014 game against the Colts, picking off Andrew Luck.

In 2015, Blake became a starter. Though the Steeler pass defense was one of its worst in decades, Blake played a role. During Week 5, he picked off Philip Rivers, and ran it 70 yards for his first pick-six. He would have 2 more picks during the year, one in a Week 8 loss to the Bengals, and one against the Bengals in the Wild Card game.

Tennessee Titans
On March 17, 2016, Blake signed with the Tennessee Titans, reuniting him with former Steelers defensive coordinator Dick Lebeau.

New York Giants 
On March 20, 2017, Blake signed with the New York Giants. On August 23, 2017, the Giants placed Blake on the Reserve/Exempt list after leaving practice. He was released on September 2, 2017.

On September 5, 2017, Blake announced his retirement from the NFL.

References

External links
UTEP Miners bio  
Jacksonville Jaguars bio  

1990 births
Living people
Players of American football from Jacksonville, Florida
Players of American football from Houston
UTEP Miners football players
American football cornerbacks
American football safeties
Jacksonville Jaguars players
Pittsburgh Steelers players
Tennessee Titans players
New York Giants players